Georg Andersen (born 5 July 1887, date of death unknown) was a German wrestler. He competed in the featherweight event at the 1912 Summer Olympics.

References

External links
 

1887 births
Year of death missing
Olympic wrestlers of Germany
Wrestlers at the 1912 Summer Olympics
German male sport wrestlers
Sportspeople from Hamburg